Mr. Pye is a Channel 4 television series written by Donald Churchill, based on the 1953 short novel Mr. Pye by Mervyn Peake, and directed by Michael Darlow. Broadcast began on 2 March 1986 in the United Kingdom.

Plot
Mr. Pye travels to the Channel Island of Sark to preach the word of God. Pye does good works and he discovers that he has started to grow angel's wings, and after consulting with a Harley Street doctor, he decides to stop doing good deeds, and instead does bad deeds. He engages in some deliberately malicious acts, and after a while this results in him growing horns on his forehead. He is unable to decide what to do, but eventually decides to reveal his horned condition to the islanders, who chase him to the edge of a cliff, which Pye flies off using his wings.

Cast
 Derek Jacobi as Mr. Pye
 Judy Parfitt as Miss Dredger
 Betty Marsden as Miss George
 Richard O'Callaghan as Thorpe

Production
The series was filmed on Sark island itself, the setting of the book.

Episodes

References

External links
 
 Channel 4 on Demand: Mr. Pye
 The Making of Mr. Pye

1986 British television series debuts
1986 British television series endings
1980s British comedy-drama television series
1980s British television miniseries
Channel 4 television dramas
Channel 4 miniseries
Television shows based on British novels
High fantasy television series
English-language television shows